Allen Walker Read (June 2, 1906 – October 16, 2002) was an American etymologist and lexicographer. Born in Minnesota, he spent much of his career as a professor at Columbia University in New York. Read's work Classic American Graffiti is well regarded in the study of latrinalia and obscenity. His etymological career included his discovery of the origin of the word "OK", a longtime puzzle, and his scholarly study of the history and use of the common English vulgarity "fuck."

Biography and career 
Read was born in Winnebago, Minnesota. His one sister, Mary Jo, became a professor of geography at Eastern Illinois University. He earned a bachelor's degree from the University of Northern Iowa (called Iowa State Teachers College at the time) in 1925, a master's degree from the University of Iowa in 1926, and studied at the University of Oxford as a Rhodes Scholar from 1928 to 1931. He was a repeated contributor to American Speech by 1931. 

Read's 1934 article in American Speech, titled "An Obscenity Symbol", is a study of the word "fuck" from a sociological perspective. In 2014, Jesse Sheidlower, the president of the American Dialect Society, called it "the most important article" written about the term, noting that ironically, Read's 14-page essay avoided using the word directly, referring to it euphemistically instead.

Classic American Graffiti 
Read's first extended work, Lexical Evidence from Folk Epigraphy in Western North America: A Glossarial Study of the Low Element in the English Vocabulary, was privately published at his own expense in Paris in 1935 since its description of bathroom graffiti was considered too racy for American publishers. Even then, the printing was limited to 75 copies and contained a disclaimer that it should be "restricted to students of linguistics, folk-lore, abnormal psychology and allied branches of social science." It was eventually published in the United States in 1977, under the title Classic American Graffiti, by Reinhold Aman's Maledicta Press. The work was described as a classic "model study" of latrinalia that "deserves the attention of any serious student of American language" in a 1979 review, which noted that even then it remained hard to access and "excessively rare." It contains some of the earliest documentation in English of words used by the homosexual community, although Read never recorded the word "gay", implying that the term was not used to mean homosexual during this time period. The work also contained Read's concept of the inverted taboo, in which some people delight in vulgarity because of its illicit nature.

Etymological career 
From 1938 onwards, he worked intermittently on a dictionary of Britishisms, but was never able to complete it during his life. During World War II, he did his service with the Military Intelligence Division working on an American Military Definition Dictionary and Military Phrase Books. He was a chaired professor at Columbia University in New York City from 1945 until 1975. In 1948, H.L. Mencken wrote that Read ''probably knows more about early Americanisms than anyone else on earth.''

The origin of "OK", a common English phrase, had been considered one of the language's biggest etymological mysteries, with a number of competing theories. Read unveiled the actual origin of the word in a series of articles published in American Speech between 1963 and 1964. This achievement The Economist described as "the pinnacle of his career" to "envious fellow etymologists", but Read considered it just "an agreeable diversion from his main work." 

Read also successfully traced the origins of the words "dixie" and "podunk", and managed to attribute the first use of "the almighty dollar" to Washington Irving. He wrote the entry for "dictionary" in the Encyclopaedia Britannica. Read's career included studies of euphemisms, graffiti, slang, pig Latin, doubletalk, and adult baby talk.

Read served as the head of the International Linguistic Association, and also as the President of the Semiotic Society of America in 1980.

Personal life 
He married Charlotte Schuchardt, director of the Institute of General Semantics, in 1953. They remained together until she died in July 2002. He died in New York City in September 2002. They had no children.

References

External links 
An essay on goodbyemag.com.

1906 births
2002 deaths
Etymologists
American semioticians
American Rhodes Scholars
Philosophers from Minnesota
People from Winnebago, Minnesota
Presidents of the Semiotic Society of America